Calhoun County Library is a historic library building located at St. Matthews, Calhoun County, South Carolina. It was built about 1877, and is a one-story, medium-gabled white clapboard structure in the Greek Revival style. It was originally built as a residence, but was adapted for use as a county library in 1949. The front façade features a three-bay, square-columned entrance porch, with smaller porches of similar design on the flanking wings.  The library is one of St. Matthews' oldest buildings.

It was listed in the National Register of Historic Places in 1975.

References

Libraries on the National Register of Historic Places in South Carolina
Greek Revival houses in South Carolina
Library buildings completed in 1877
Buildings and structures in Calhoun County, South Carolina
National Register of Historic Places in Calhoun County, South Carolina
1877 establishments in South Carolina